Kenozersky National Park is a national park in the north of Russia, located in Kargopolsky and Plesetsky Districts of Arkhangelsk Oblast. It was established December 28, 1991. Since 2004, the national park is a UNESCO Biosphere Reserve.

History 

Kenozero was always a remote area. In the 19th century, the area was divided between Pudozhsky Uyezd (west) and Kargopolsky Uyezd (east) of the Olonets Governorate. In Soviet Union, after a number of administrative changes, the area ended up in the Arkhangelsk Oblast. In 1950s—1980s, as everywhere in Russian North, the area suffered severely from depopulation, in particular, all villages between Lake Lyokshmozero and Lake Kenozero were deserted.

In 1991, the decision was taken to create a National Park in the area. All historical monuments were transferred to the park administration, and some of them have been restored. December 28, 1991 the park was officially created. The staff of the park at the time of creation was 7 persons. In 1992 it was increased to 35 persons, and in 1993 to 153. In 2004, the park became a UNESCO Biosphere Reserve.

Location and geography 

Kenozersky National Park occupies the south-western part of Plesetsky District and the north-western part of Kargopolsky District of the Arkhangelsk Oblast, at the border with the Republic of Karelia. The northern part of the Park is centered at the Lake Kenozero, one of the biggest lakes of the region. The headquarters of the Park are located in the village of Vershinino, on the northern shore of the lake. The Lake Kenozero is the source of the Kena River, a major left tributary of the Onega. The upper course of the Kena is located in the park, as well as the Pocha River, the major tributary of the Lake Kenozero, its source, Lake Pochozero, and the lower course of the main tributary of the Lake Pochozero, the Undosha River.

The southern part contains Lake Lyokshmozero and the upper course of the Lyokshma River, a tributary of Lake Lacha. Lakes Lyokshmozero and Kenozero are separated by a number of lesser lakes, including Lake Naglimozero and Lake Vilno.

Some areas along the Karelian border drain into the basin of the Vodla, and eventually to the Baltic Sea. Thus, the park contains the portion of the divide between the basins of Atlantic and Arctic oceans.

Tourism 

The park contains natural as well as cultural monuments, and is also oriented at ecotourism. A number of trails have been opened in the park.

There are several wooden architecture monuments. One of them is Porzhensky Pogost in the western part of the park, which is the ensemble of St. George church with the bell-tower (both from the 18th century) surrounded by the wooden wall with gates and towers (1789). The villages adjacent to Porzhensky Pogost have been deserted, and there is no road heading to it, so that the Pogost is only accessible via a pedestrian trail.

There are two roads into the park. In the southern part, south of Lake Lyokshmozero, there is an unpaved road connecting Kargopol and Pudozh. Another road in the northern part of the park branches off from the Onezhsky Trakt, connecting Kargopol via Plesetsk to Yemetsk. This road runs to the village on Pershlakhta on Lake Kenozero and then connects to the other villages on and around Lake Kenozero.

References

External links 

 
 

Geography of Arkhangelsk Oblast
National parks of Russia
Protected areas established in 1991
Tourist attractions in Arkhangelsk Oblast
World Heritage Tentative List
1991 establishments in Russia